Interim is an album by English post-punk band The Fall, compiled from live and studio material and released in 2004 by record label Hip Priest.

Content
Interim features the first officially released versions of "Clasp Hands", "Blindness" and "What About Us?" – all of which were later included on the band's next studio album Fall Heads Roll (2005) – as well as the instrumental "I'm Ronnie the Oney". The remaining tracks are all new versions of previously released songs, mostly from studio rehearsal recordings.

Interim was originally to be titled Cocked - the alternate title was given on a promotional CD for "Blindness", which also gave the track's title as "Blind Man".

Track listing

Personnel
 Mark E. Smith – vocals, guitar on "Mere Pseud Mag Ed"
 Ben Pritchard – guitar
 Jim Watts – guitar
 Steve Trafford – bass guitar
 Spencer Birtwistle – drums
 Elena Poulou – keyboards, vocals
 Ed Blaney – guitar, vocals

References

The Fall (band) compilation albums
2004 compilation albums